Rafik El Hamdi (born 3 January 1994) is a professional footballer who plays as a midfielder for Derde Divisie club Sportlust '46. Born in the Netherlands, he has represented Morocco at youth level.

Club career
El Hamdi joined CR Al Hoceima in Morocco in July 2018, and played for the club for a half year, before leaving. He then moved back til Netherlands and joined Derde Divisie club VV Eemdijk.

International career
El Hamdi was called up and capped for the Morocco U23s in a friendly 1-0 win against the Cameroon U23s.

References

External links
 Voetbal International profile 
 

1994 births
Living people
Moroccan footballers
Dutch footballers
FC Volendam players
Chabab Rif Al Hoceima players
Eerste Divisie players
Botola players
People from Purmerend
Association football midfielders
Morocco youth international footballers
Dutch sportspeople of Moroccan descent
Footballers from North Holland
VVOG players
Sportlust '46 players
Derde Divisie players